Raiffeisen-Landesbank Tirol A.G. is an Austrian grouping of cooperative banks based in Innsbruck, Tyrol. The bank is the central institute of Raiffeisenbank in Tyrol. The bank is a member of Raiffeisen Bankengruppe (as one of the eight Raiffeisen-Landesbank of Austria), which is a member of Österreichischer Raiffeisenverband, and in turn a member of Internationale Raiffeisen-Union.

The bank was one of the shareholders of Raiffeisen Bank International (for 3.7% of shares), the national central bank of Austrian Raiffeisenbank.

The bank also formed a joint venture AlpenBank with its Italian counterpart: Raiffeisen Landesbank Südtirol – Cassa Centrale Raiffeisen dell'Alto Adige.

References

External links

 

Privately held companies of Austria
Companies based in Innsbruck
Tyrol (state)
Banks established in 1894
1894 establishments in Austria-Hungary
Raiffeisen Zentralbank